Britannia was built in France in 1774. The British captured her in 1781 and she began sailing under the name Sally, first as a transport and then as a West Indiaman. Liverpool merchants purchased her and she became Britannia in 1787. She then sailed to the Baltic and Russia. She was wrecked in 1793.

Career
Sally first appeared Lloyd's Register (LR) in 1782 with J.Croskill, master, A.Brough, owner, and trade London transport. She had undergone thorough repairs in 1782.

On 24 October 1785 Sally ran on shore at New Providence.

Sally appeared under the name Britannia in 1787, after Liverpool merchants purchased her.

Fate
Britannia was lost in October 1793 whilst on a voyage from Arkhangelsk, Russia to a British port.

Citations and references
Citations

References
 

1774 ships
Ships built in France
Age of Sail merchant ships of England
Maritime incidents in 1785
Maritime incidents in 1793